Wolfgang Dramsch (born 22 July 1949) is a retired German football goalkeeper.

He played eight seasons in the 2. Bundesliga with 1. FC Schweinfurt 05, VfL Osnabrück and Alemannia Aachen. In total, he made 280 appearances in the league.

References

External links

1949 births
Living people
Sportspeople from Braunschweig
German footballers
1. FC Schweinfurt 05 players
Alemannia Aachen players
VfL Osnabrück players
Association football goalkeepers
2. Bundesliga players
Footballers from Lower Saxony